The Four Feathers is a 1921 British silent war film directed by René Plaissetty and starring Harry Ham, Mary Massart and Henry Vibart. The film is an adaptation of A. E. W. Mason's 1902 novel of the same name. The film was made on location and at Cricklewood Studios by Stoll Pictures, at the time the largest British film studio. It was the second film version of the story, following a 1915 American film. The film was shot on location in North Africa. It was reasonably successful on its release.

Synopsis
When a British army officer, Harry Faversham, resigns his commission on the eve of his regiment's departure for service in the Sudan he is sent four white feathers of cowardice by his comrades and fiancée. In an attempt to redeem himself, Faversham travels out to the Sudan where he saves the lives of his former comrades.

Cast
 Harry Ham as Harry Faversham
 Mary Massart as Ethne Eustace
 Cyril Percival as Jack Durrance
 Henry Vibart as General Faversham
 Tony Fraser as Abou Fatma
 Robert English as Lieutenant Sutch
 Harry Worth as Major Willoughby
 Gwen Williams as Mrs. Adair
M. Gray Murray as Dermond Eustace
 C. W. Cundell as Lieutenant Trench
 Roger Livesey as Harry as a child

References

Bibliography
 Low, Rachael. History of the British Film, 1918-1929. George Allen & Unwin, 1971.

External links
 
 

Films based on The Four Feathers
1921 films
1920s historical adventure films
British black-and-white films
1920s English-language films
British historical adventure films
British silent feature films
British epic films
Films set in the 1880s
Stoll Pictures films
Films directed by René Plaissetty
Films shot at Cricklewood Studios
1920s war adventure films
British war adventure films
1920s British films
Silent historical adventure films
Silent war films
Films about the British Army